William C. Giese (April 18, 1886 – April 15, 1966) was an American educator and politician from Michigan and Wisconsin. He served one term in the Wisconsin State Assembly after his career in education, from 1953 to 1955.

Biography
Born in Reed City, Michigan, Giese also grew up there. He attended local schools, graduating from Reed City High School. He received his bachelor's degree from Kalamazoo College and his master's degree from Columbia University in New York City. He served in the United States Army during World War I.  Giese worked as a teacher, principal, and high school football coach in Menominee, Michigan.

In 1919 he moved to Racine, Wisconsin as principal of the Racine high school. He later served as principal of Park High School. In 1933 Giese was selected as superintendent of the city's public school system, a position he held until retiring in 1951.

Giese next entered politics. Elected as a Republican, he served one term in the Wisconsin State Assembly, from 1953 to 1955. He died in Racine, Wisconsin.

Notes

1886 births
1966 deaths
People from Menominee, Michigan
People from Reed City, Michigan
Politicians from Racine, Wisconsin
Kalamazoo College alumni
Columbia University alumni
Educators from Michigan
Educators from Wisconsin
Republican Party members of the Wisconsin State Assembly
20th-century American politicians
United States Army personnel of World War I